Mustafa Rahmi Koç (born 9 October 1930) is a Turkish businessman. In 2016, Forbes ranked him No. 906 richest person in the world with a net worth of $2.6 billion. In 2013, he was the Turkish person who paid the most income taxes in his country, totalling 37.5 million lira.

Biography

Early life 
Rahmi Koç was the only son of one of Turkey's wealthiest men Vehbi Koç. He attended high school at Robert College in Istanbul after his primary education in Ankara. Rahmi Koç then studied at the Johns Hopkins University in the US and received his BA in industrial management.

Career 
Following his military service, he started actively working for the Koç Group in 1958, joining the Otokoç Company in Ankara. In 1960, he transferred to Koç Ticaret, which represented the Koç Group in Ankara. Following the relocation of the Koç Holding headquarters from Ankara to Istanbul in 1964, which was established a year earlier, he became general coordinator of Koç Holding A.Ş. and moved to Istanbul.

Thereafter in 1970, he became chairman of the executive committee and in 1975 deputy chairman of the board of management. Rahmi Koç was appointed chairman of the Koç Holding management committee in 1980. His father Vehbi Koç transferred his chairmanship to his son on 30 March 1984. Rahmi Koç retired from this duty on 4 April 2003, transferring his chair to his eldest son Mustafa Koç. Rahmi Koç is currently Honorary Chairman of the Koç Holding.

A visit to Henry Ford Museum in Michigan inspired him to create the Rahmi M Koç Museum in Istanbul, which is dedicated to the history of transport, industry and communications exhibiting trains, submarines and autos.

In 2013, he bought the Merrill-Stevens Drydock & Repair Co., Florida's oldest boatyard, and renamed it RMK Merrill-Stevens. He is the owner of a 171-foot yacht, the Nazenin V.

Other mandates and memberships 
 Chairman of the International Chamber of Commerce for the term 1995–1996
 Member of the Rotary club
 Member of the Istanbul Open Sea Yacht Club and New York Yacht Club.

Honorary doctorates
Rahmi Koç received honorary doctorates from the following universities:
 21 May 1998 Johns Hopkins University, Baltimore, Maryland, USA
 28 September 1998 Anadolu University, Eskişehir
 14 May 1999 Ege University, İzmir
 14 June 1999 Bilkent Üniversitesi, Ankara
 23 April 2001 Ovidius University, Constanţa, Romania.

Awards
Rahmi Koç was awarded by various national and international institutions as listed below:
 Officier dans L'Ordre national de la Légion d'honneur (of France), 2015
 German "Großes Verdienstkreuz" (Great Cross of Merit)
 Italian "Ordine al Merito della Repubblica" (Order of Merit of the Republic), 2001
 Turkish "State Medal of Distinguished Service" (1997)

Private life 
He is a big fan and financial supporter of Beşiktaş J.K.

Rahmi Koç has three sons: Mustafa Vehbi (1960–2016), Ömer Mehmet (1962) and Ali Yıldırım (1967) from his previous marriage to Çiğdem Simavi. His son Mustafa died on 21 January 2016, of a heart attack, at the age of 55.

See also 
 List of billionaires

References

External links 
Koç Holding A.Ş.
Rahmi M. Koç Museum
Creating Emerging Markets Interview at the Harvard Business School

1930 births
People from Ankara
Robert College alumni
Living people
Rahmi Mustafa
Johns Hopkins University alumni
Turkish businesspeople
Turkish philanthropists
Turkish billionaires
Commanders Crosses of the Order of Merit of the Federal Republic of Germany
Museum founders
Recipients of the State Medal of Distinguished Service